This is the results breakdown of the local elections held in the Valencian Community on 26 May 1991. The following tables show detailed results in the autonomous community's most populous municipalities, sorted alphabetically.

Overall

City control
The following table lists party control in the most populous municipalities, including provincial capitals (shown in bold). Gains for a party are displayed with the cell's background shaded in that party's colour.

Municipalities

Alcoy
Population: 65,082

Alicante
Population: 267,485

Benidorm
Population: 41,556

Castellón de la Plana
Population: 135,863

Elche
Population: 184,912

Elda
Population: 57,515

Gandia
Population: 54,778

Orihuela
Population: 46,471

Paterna
Population: 48,548

Sagunto
Population: 58,135

Torrent
Population: 57,137

Torrevieja
Population: 23,192

Valencia

Population: 758,738

See also
1991 Valencian regional election

References

Valencian Community
1991